Amay is a municipality of Wallonia located in the province of Liège, Belgium. 

On 1 January 2006 Amay had a total population of approximately 14,231. The total area is 27.61 km2 which gives a population density of approximately 476 inhabitants per km2. It owes its site to a ford of the Meuse that was still in use in the Middle Ages but had begun as a Gallo-Roman vicus of the civitas Tungrorum (Tongeren).

The municipality consists of the following districts: Amay, Ampsin, Flône, Jehay, and Ombret-Rawsa.

Places of interest

 Castle of Jehay-Bodegnée, a 16th-century castle

Famous inhabitants
 François Walther de Sluze (1622–1685), mathematician and abbot of Amay
 Zénobe Gramme (1824-1902), inventor of the dynamo

References

Richard Stillwell, ed. Princeton Encyclopaedia of Classical Sites, 1976: "Amay, Belgium"

External links
 

 
Municipalities of Liège Province
Burial sites of the Pippinids